Queensland Roar took part in the 2006–07 A-League competition, hoping to improve on their performance in the previous domestic season, which saw them finish in sixth position at the end of the A-League competition.

Transfers

In

Out

Squad

Injuries & replacements 
 Round 8 to Season Massimo Murdocca (foot)
 Round 14 to Round 18 Marcus Wedau (grade one hamstring tear) replaced by Chris Grossman

Suspensions 
 Round 15 Chad Gibson (red card)

Coaches 
Coach Miron Bleiberg resigned after the Round 12 loss to Adelaide United. Frank Farina became coach on 16 November 2006.

Pre-Season cup

Summary

Group stage

Playoffs 

Seventh place playoff

2006–07 A-League Season

Summary 

KEY
(N) = Night game
(T) = Twilight game

Table

Goal scorers 
5 Goals
Dario Vidosic
4 Goals
Ante Milicic
Reinaldo
3 Goals
Simon Lynch
Matt McKay
2 Goals
Damian Mori
1 Goal
Stuart McLaren
Spase Dilevski
Ben Griffin
Own Goals
Chad Gibson
Josh McCloughlan
Sasa Ognenovski
Andrew Packer

Clean sheets 
Liam Reddy – 6

Notes and references 

Brisbane Roar FC seasons
Queensland Roar Season, 2006-07